Tiberiu Cristian Curt (born 26 April 1975) is a Romanian former professional footballer who played as a defender. In his career Curt played 319 matches in the Liga I for teams like: Farul Constanța, Rapid București, FC U Craiova, Steaua București and Dinamo București, but most of the matches he played were for Național București, 135. Despite the fact that he started his football career very late, at 12 years old, Tiberiu Curt is part of a small group of players who played for all three important teams of Bucharest: Steaua, Dinamo and Rapid.

Currently he is the vice-president of Farul Constanța.

International career
Tiberiu Curt played for Romania only in 2 matches, in 1996, against Israel and United Arab Emirates.

International stats

Honours

Steaua București
Divizia A: 2004–05

References

External links
 
 

1975 births
Living people
People from Medgidia
Romanian footballers
Association football defenders
Liga I players
Liga II players
FCV Farul Constanța players
FC Rapid București players
FC U Craiova 1948 players
FC Progresul București players
FC Steaua București players
FC Dinamo București players
Romania international footballers